The 2000 season was the Indianapolis Colts' 48th in the National Football League (NFL) and their 17th in Indianapolis. They finished second in the AFC East with a 10–6 record, but lost in overtime to their division rival Miami Dolphins in the wildcard round of the playoffs.

As in the previous season, the Colts once again sent Peyton Manning, Edgerrin James and Marvin Harrison to the Pro Bowl at the end of the season.

Offseason

NFL Draft

Undrafted free agents

Personnel

Staff

Roster

Preseason

Regular season

Schedule

Note: Intra-division opponents are in bold text.

Game summaries

Week 1

Week 2

This was the first time the Raiders had ever visited Indianapolis, with their previous away game against the Colts having occurred as far back as 1975. This anomaly was due to old NFL scheduling formulas in place prior to 2002, whereby teams had no rotating schedule opposing members of other divisions within their own conference, but instead played interdivisional conference games according to position within a season's table.

Week 4

Week 5

Week 6

Standings

Playoffs
The team earned a Wild Card berth to the playoffs as the No. 6 seed and traveled to Miami to face the Dolphins. The Dolphins turned the ball over three times in the first half as the Colts staked a 14–0 lead by halftime. Miami then outscored the Colts 17–3 in the second half to send it to overtime. The Colts had a chance to win the game with a 49-yard FG but Mike Vanderjagt's kick was wide right. The Dolphins then marched 61 yards in 11 plays, ending with a Lamar Smith game-winning touchdown.

Awards and records
 Marvin Harrison, AFC Pro Bowl Selection
 Edgerrin James, AFC Offensive Player of the Week, week 7
 Edgerrin James, AFC Offensive Player of the Week, week 15
 Edgerrin James, AFC Pro Bowl Selection,
 Peyton Manning, AFC Offensive Player of the Week, week 4
 Peyton Manning, AFC Offensive Player of the Week, week 17
 Peyton Manning, AFC Pro Bowl Selection
 Hunter Smith, AFC Special Teams Player of the Month, September
 Mike Vanderjagt, AFC Special Teams Player of the Week, week 5

References

Indianapolis Colts
Indianapolis Colts seasons
Colts